The 1986 World Rally Championship was the 14th season of the Fédération Internationale de l'Automobile (FIA) World Rally Championship (WRC).  The season consisted of 13 rallies, including all twelve venues of the previous season as well as the addition of the Olympus Rally.  This marked the return of the WRC to the United States and North America, as well as the first world rally to be held on the western side of the continent.  The December rally would also be the only WRC event to feature Group B competition in the United States.

The 1986 season was notable for being the last World Rally Championship season driven with the popular Group B rally cars, which were banned after the fatal crashes at the Rally Portugal, where three spectators were killed and more than 30 injured, and at the Tour de Corse, where Henri Toivonen and his co-driver Sergio Cresto died in a fireball accident. This was the year where Group B (first introduced in 1982) was at its peak, and the 1986 season saw some of the most powerful and sophisticated rally cars ever built, some of which were mid-engined, like the Lancia Delta S4 and the Ford RS200. The drivers' championship was won by Peugeot's Juha Kankkunen, followed by two other "Flying Finns", Lancia's Markku Alén and Kankkunen's teammate Timo Salonen. The manufacturers' title was taken by Peugeot, after a close battle with the Martini-sponsored Lancia team.

Summary

The season began with the Monte Carlo Rally and Henri Toivonen took the win with his Lancia Delta S4, making himself the favourite for the title. At the International Swedish Rally in wintery snow and ice, Toivonen had to retire due to an engine failure and Juha Kankkunen won the event with his Peugeot 205 Turbo 16 E2, ahead of Toivonen's teammate Markku Alén. At the next rally in Portugal, Joaquim Santos lost control of his Ford RS200 and plunged into the crowd, killing three spectators and injuring more than 30. All the factory team drivers decided to withdraw from the race, giving the win to home country's relatively unknown driver, Joaquim Moutinho.

After veteran Swede Björn Waldegård's triumph at the extremely arduous and difficult Safari Rally in Kenya driving a Toyota Celica TCT over Alén and his Lancia 037 Evo (which was the S4's predecessor and used only by Lancia for the Safari Rally; the S4 was not used for the Safari Rally due to Lancia determining that it was too new and not developed enough for that rally), another fatal accident at the Tour de Corse on the French island of Corsica would change the course of rallying. Toivonen and his co-driver Sergio Cresto in their Lancia went off the side of the road, plunged down a ravine and landed on its roof. The aluminium fuel tank underneath the driver's seat was ruptured by the trees and exploded. Toivonen and Cresto had no time to get out and both men burned to death in their seats. The accident had no witnesses close enough to clearly see the accident.

This caused Jean-Marie Balestre and the FISA to immediately freeze the development of the Group B cars and ban them from competing for the 1987 season. Audi and Ford decided to withdraw from competing, while other teams continued with their Group B models until the end of the season. Peugeot boss Jean Todt was outraged over the ban and pursued legal action against the federation. After Lancia's remaining car retirement, the Tour de Corse was eventually won by Peugeot's Bruno Saby, which marked his career-first WRC victory. The Acropolis Rally in Greece and the New Zealand Rally were won consecutively by Kankkunen; and the third driver to take his debut win during the season was Lancia's Miki Biasion, who edged out teammate Alén to win the Rally Argentina. 

Finnish drivers finished first, second and third in the Jyväskylä Rally (otherwise known as the Finnish Rally, the fastest race of the year), with Salonen and Kankkunen giving Peugeot a 1-2 result, with Alén coming in third for Lancia. This was not much of a surprise, as this rally had only ever been won by Finnish and Swedish drivers until 1990. The Ivory Coast Rally, which was considered to be the most demanding, gruelling and certainly the most attrition-filled rally of the year (a rally where drivers had an unbelievable one in ten chance of finishing) was skipped by all of the Group B teams except Toyota, and was won by Waldegård in his Celica, completing his World Championship African rally sweep. The season included more controversy when the organizers of the Rallye Sanremo disqualified the entire Peugeot team from the event due to illegal side skirts. However, the cars were proven legal by the FIA, and the Italian organizers were blamed for not allowing French Peugeots to take the win ahead of the Italian Lancias. Eventually, the FISA annulled the results of the whole event. Peugeot then became the manufacturers' champions, but Kankkunen was not sure about his title over Alén until three weeks after the season ended, at the RAC Rally in the United Kingdom, specifically Wales and England. Salonen won this race, with Alen finishing second and Kankkunen third, this was enough for Kankkunen to take the Driver's Championship. The last WRC round of the year was the first Olympus Rally in the state of Washington in the northwest United States, which Alén won, with Kankkunen finishing second.

1986 marked the only season in which the FIA issued the World Championship for Drivers of Group A Cars. Swede Kenneth Eriksson, driving a Volkswagen Golf GTI 16V took the title ahead of Austrian Rudi Stohl in his Audi Coupe Quattro, a lower powered version of the Group B Quattros.  This championship became unnecessary in future years due to the elimination of Group B cars.  From 1987 onwards, Group A cars would be the vehicles used by drivers competing for the main World Rally Championship for Drivers.

Teams and drivers

Lancia ran out of time to build the safari version of the Delta S4

Events

Map

Schedule and results

 FISA later annulled the results.

Standings

Drivers' championship

Manufacturers' championship

Pointscoring systems

Drivers' championship

Manufacturers' championship

References

External links 

 FIA World Rally Championship 1986 at ewrc-results.com
 Season 1986 at juwra.com

World Rally Championship
World Rally Championship seasons